Mark Young (born June 5, 1960) is a Canadian football player who played professionally for the Hamilton Tiger-Cats and Montreal Concordes.

References

1960 births
Living people
Montreal Concordes players
Hamilton Tiger-Cats players
Morgan State Bears football players
Canadian football defensive backs